Ballyclogh may refer to:

Ballyclogh, County Cork, a village in Ireland
Townlands in County Antrim, Northern Ireland:
Ballyclogh, County Antrim
Ballyclogh (Centre)
Ballyclogh (North Centre)
Ballyclogh (South Centre)